Serine/arginine-rich splicing factor 7 (SRSF7) also known as splicing factor, arginine/serine-rich 7 (SFRS7) or splicing factor 9G8 is a protein that in humans is encoded by the SRSF7 gene.

Function 

The protein encoded by this gene is a member of the serine/arginine (SR)-rich family of pre-mRNA splicing factors, which constitute part of the spliceosome. Each of these factors contains an RNA recognition motif (RRM) for binding RNA and an RS domain for binding other proteins. The RS domain is rich in serine and arginine residues and facilitates interaction between different SR splicing factors. In addition to being critical for mRNA splicing, the SR proteins have also been shown to be involved in mRNA export from the nucleus and in translation.

Model organisms 

Model organisms have been used in the study of SRSF7 function. A conditional knockout mouse line called Srsf7tm1a(EUCOMM)Wtsi was generated at the Wellcome Trust Sanger Institute. Male and female animals underwent a standardized phenotypic screen to determine the effects of deletion. Additional screens performed:  - In-depth immunological phenotyping

References

Further reading